Houghton is a small village and a civil parish in the English county of Norfolk. At the 2011 census the population of the parish was again below 100, and was therefore included in the civil parish of West Rudham.

For the purposes of local government, Houghton falls within the district of King's Lynn and West Norfolk. It is the location of Houghton Hall, a large country house built by Robert Walpole, the first Prime Minister of the United Kingdom, who was born in the village in 1676.

History
The village is listed as Houtuna in the Domesday Book of 1086. It takes its name from the Old English language; hoh (hill-spur) plus tun (enclosure, settlement or farm). The old village of Houghton was demolished in 1722 to make way for the construction of Houghton Hall and the associated parkland. In 1729, the village was rebuilt on the edge of the estate and called New Houghton; the 33 surviving houses are all now Grade II listed buildings. It is one of the locations claimed to be the inspiration for Oliver Goldsmith's poem The Deserted Village. 

In 1872, the parish had 53 houses and 227 inhabitants. Other names for the village were Houghton-in-the-Brake and Houghton-Next-Harpley.

The Church of St Martin at Tours stands inside the park and dates from the 13th century, although it was heavily restored in the 18th century when the Gothick tower was added. The first British prime minister, Sir Robert Walpole, (1676–1745), later 1st Earl of Orford, and his son, the writer Horace Walpole, (1717–1797), are buried in St Martin's Church, which is a Grade I listed building.

Notes

External links

King's Lynn and West Norfolk
Villages in Norfolk
Civil parishes in Norfolk